Pedicellina is a genus of Entoprocta.

Description 
A genus of colonial Entoprocta.

Etymology 
From “pedicellus” (small foot in Latin) + “ina”.

Taxonomy 
Pedicellina contains the following species:

 Pedicellina cernua
 Pedicellina newberryi

References 

Entoprocta